Forever Autumn is a BBC Books original novel written by Mark Morris and based on the long-running science fiction television series Doctor Who. It features the Tenth Doctor and Martha Jones.

Awards 
Doctor Who Magazine Issue 396 revealed the Merchandise Awards results; Forever Autumn won first place for best Doctor Who book, just beating The Doctor Who Storybook 2008 and Sting of the Zygons.

Audiobook
An abridged audiobook version was released in March 2008 by BBC Audiobooks and was read by Will Thorp, who played Toby Zed in the TV Series two-part story, "The Impossible Planet"/"The Satan Pit".

See also

Whoniverse

References

External links

The Cloister Library - Forever Autumn

2007 British novels
2007 science fiction novels
New Series Adventures
Tenth Doctor novels
Novels by Mark Morris
Halloween novels

ru:Forever Autumn